Night Bugs is the second album by Canadian artist Sarah Slean.

Track listing 

 "Eliot" - 4:22
 "Weight" - 3:16
 "Duncan" - 4:08
 "St. Francis" - 4:12
 "Drastic Measures" - 5:42
 "Book Smart, Street Stupid" - 4:49
 "Dark Room" - 2:27
 "Sweet Ones" - 3:13
 "Me, I'm A Thief" - 6:09
 "My Invitation" - 3:34
 "Bank Accounts" - 3:04

 All songs by Sarah Slean
 All strings arranged and conducted by Sarah Slean
 All horns arranged and conducted by Sarah Slean, except mid-song trumpet solo in "Bank Accounts" by Sarah McElcheran

Personnel
 Piano, vocals - Sarah Slean
 Trumpet - Jim Hynes, Jeff Kievit
 French Horn - Chris Korner
 Trombone - Michael Davis
 Violin - Peter Seminov, Eric Leong
 Cello - Judith McIntyre, Dana Leong
 Viola (on "Eliot" and "Dark Room") - Valentina Charlap-Evans

Sarah Slean albums